Yanaul (Yañawıl) is a rural locality (a village) in Shushnursky Selsoviet, Krasnokamsky District, Bashkortostan, Russia. The population was 7 as of 2010.

References 

Rural localities in Krasnokamsky District